Stafford is a census-designated place (listed as Stafford Courthouse) in and the county seat of Stafford County in the northern part of the U.S. Commonwealth of Virginia. The population of Stafford County as of the 2010 United States Census was 128,984. Marine Corps Base Quantico is located north of the community. Stafford Courthouse is located at the intersections of U.S. Route 1 and Courthouse Road.

History
English sea captain Samuel Argall abducted Pocahontas near this area in April 1613 in an attempt to secure release of some English prisoners held by her father. Rebecca married English colonist John Rolfe in 1614. They sailed in 1616 to England where Pocahontas died in 1617.

It was a stop on the Richmond, Fredericksburg and Potomac Railroad in the nineteenth Century; CSX Transportation is the RF&P's successor today.

Accokeek Furnace Archeological Site, Aquia Church, Public Quarry at Government Island, Redoubt No. 2, and Stafford Training School are listed on the National Register of Historic Places.

Notable people

 Joey Slye American football kicker for the Washington Commanders
 Erin Cahill, actress
 Traci Hunter Abramson, novelist
 Palmer Hayden, American Painter
 Gary Jennings Jr., NFL Wide Receiver
 Pocahontas, Native American princess
 George Washington, 1st president of The United States

References

External links

 
 Official website for the County
 Stafford County Public Schools
 Stafford County Tourism

Census-designated places in Stafford County, Virginia
Census-designated places in Virginia
County seats in Virginia